Platyphoca is an extinct genus of earless seals from Neogene marine deposits in the North Sea basin.

Fossils
There are two recognized species of Platyphoca, P. vulgaris and P. danica. P. vulgaris is known from Pliocene marine deposits in the Antwerp region of Belgium, while fossils of P. danica have been found in the Tortonian-age Gram Formation in Denmark.

References

Miocene pinnipeds
Pliocene pinnipeds
Phocines
Prehistoric carnivoran genera
Prehistoric pinnipeds of Europe
Fossil taxa described in 1877